Clockstoppers is a 2002 American science fiction action comedy film directed by Jonathan Frakes and produced by Gale Anne Hurd and Julia Pistor. The film stars Jesse Bradford, Paula Garcés, French Stewart, Michael Biehn, Robin Thomas, and Julia Sweeney.

The film was produced by Nickelodeon Movies and distributed by Paramount Pictures.

Plot
The NSA-funded Quantum Tech (QT) Corporation has slated a project to develop Hypertime, a technology which allows the user's molecules to speed up to the point where the world appears in standstill. NSA head Moore ends the project due to the risk of the technology being acquired by hostile powers. QT's CEO Henry Gates plans on using Hypertime to dominate the world, but these plans are now falling apart: The NSA has given him only a weekend before they collect his equipment, his lead scientist Earl Dopler cannot fix a glitch which causes subjects in Hypertime to age rapidly, and after his henchmen prevent Dopler's incognito departure at the airport, Dopler informs Gates that he sent information on Hypertime and a prototype Hypertime wristwatch to his former teacher Dr. George Gibbs in hopes he could find a fix for the glitch.

Gibbs' daughter Kelly accidentally knocks the watch into a box of his son Zak's things. George is away at a convention on applied science, having turned down Zak's appeals to go car shopping with him. Zak repeatedly bombs out with Francesca, the hot new girl at school, first with a condescending offer to show her around and then, after she allows him to help her rake leaves, by bringing a live opossum into her house. However, she is impressed when he shows her the power of the watch, which they use to pull pranks around town, and later help Zak's friend Meeker win a battle of the DJs contest. At the end of the date she gives Zak a goodnight kiss.

Gates sends henchmen, armed with Hypertime watches and solid nitrogen guns for putting other Hypertime users back into normal time, to George's house to recover the prototype. While fleeing from them, Zak discovers Dopler tied up in their van and frees him. A chase ensues, with Zak crashing the van into a river, thus disabling the watch. Zak awakens in a hospital and is charged with stealing the van. He gets the watch working just long enough to steal a policeman's uniform, allowing him to evade both the police and Gates's henchmen. QT Corporation contacts national security agencies and portrays Zak, George and Dopler as fugitives. Zak goes on the run with Francesca, locating the hotel that George is staying at. QT reaches George first and kidnaps him to replace Dopler.

Dopler captures Zak and Francesca with a garbage truck. Francesca knocks Dopler out and she and Zak interrogate Dopler. Dopler reluctantly agrees to help save George. Using components that the three of them steal from the science convention, Dopler mends the broken watch and builds their own set of nitrogen guns.

Zak and Francesca break in. After activating Hypertime, Zak swaps a nonfunctional watch onto his wrist as a backup plan. QT captures Zak and Francesca, confiscates the nonfunctional watch, and throws them in a cell with George. The NSA deadline expires, so Gates puts the whole facility into Hypertime to stop the approaching NSA agents. Using his concealed watch while in Hypertime causes Zak's particles to accelerate to the point of instability, allowing him to pass through the walls of their cell and divert Gates and his henchmen long enough for George to rig a bomb which destroys the machine generating Hypertime. Gates tries to kill Francesca, Zak and George, but Dopler arrives and shoots Gates with nitrogen. The NSA agents take the watches to keep them safe, and arrest Gates and his henchmen, and the charges against Zak are dropped.

Dopler uses the machine he was building to reverse the aging effects of Hypertime, but it inadvertently changes him back into a teenager, meaning he will have to live with the Gibbs family for a few years. George lets Zak get the car he wanted. As Zak speeds off in his car with Kelly, Francesca, and Dopler, the police officer and detective from earlier drive after them to try to stop Zak for speeding. However, it is revealed that Zak has not returned the watch and continues to have fun in Hypertime.

Cast
 Jesse Bradford as Zak Gibbs, a boy who finds a time-stopping watch.
 Paula Garcés as Francesca, a Venezuelan girl who moves to Zak's town.
 French Stewart as Earl Dopler, a scientist that was unwillingly brought back into the services of QT Corporation.
 Miko Hughes as young Earl Dopler
 Michael Biehn as Henry Gates, the CEO of QT Corporation.
 Garikayi Mutambirwa as Meeker, Zak's best friend.
 Robin Thomas as Dr. George Gibbs, a scientist who is the father of Zak and the colleague of Earl Doppler.
 Julia Sweeney as Jenny Gibbs, the mother of Zak.
 Lindze Letherman as Kelly Gibbs, the sister of Zak.
 Grant Marvin as Prof. Jenning
 Jason George as Richard, an agent who works for Henry.
 Linda Kim as Jay, a silent agent who works for Henry.
 Ken Jenkins as Moore, an agent of the NSA
 Jonathan Frakes (uncredited cameo) as a bystander
 Judi M. Durand as the uncredited voice of the Q.T. Computer
 Jenette Goldstein as Doctor
 DJ Swamp as himself

Production
The film's director, Jonathan Frakes, later recalled, "That script had been at Paramount a long time, and because of the success of First Contact and Insurrection, Paramount blew the dust off and got a rewrite and we did it at a nice price."

The shot of the accelerated Zak being frozen was done as a green screen composite of three shots: one with Zak actor Jesse Bradford leaping, one with Michael Biehn aiming the nitrogen gun, and one with the scenery and the computer-generated nitrogen stream.

Soundtrack

Home media

Clockstoppers was released on VHS and DVD on August 13, 2002.  Warner Home Video (who releases Paramount titles on DVD and Blu-ray under license, as Paramount themselves have moved to digital-only distribution) reissued Clockstoppers on DVD on September 24, 2013 and was released on Blu-ray on January 25, 2022.

Reception
On Rotten Tomatoes, the film has an approval rating of 29% based on 85 reviews, with an average rating of 4.81/10. The website's critics consensus called it "A pleasant diversion for the young teens, but a waste of time for anyone older." On Metacritic it has a weighted average score of 40 out of 100, based on 24 critics, indicating "mixed or average reviews". Audiences polled by CinemaScore gave the film an average grade of "B+" on an A+ to F scale.

Roger Ebert of the Chicago Sun-Times gave it 2.5 out of 4, and wrote: "The movie has been produced by Nickelodeon, and will no doubt satisfy its intended audience enormously." He also notes that it does not cross over, and offers little for parents or older brothers and sisters. Robert Koehler of Variety called it "A blandly conceived youth adventure lacking zing or style."

Clockstoppers opened at a number five at the box office ranking in $10.1 million in its first opening weekend, the following week it went down to #7 where it spent a week more. The film grossed a total of $38.8 million against a budget of $26 million.

See Also
 A Kind of a Stopwatch
 Bernard's Watch

References

External links

 
 

2002 films
2002 science fiction action films
2002 thriller films
American science fantasy films
American science fiction films
American science fiction comedy films
American teen films
American thriller films
Films about the National Security Agency
Films about time travel
Films directed by Jonathan Frakes
Films produced by Gale Anne Hurd
Films scored by Jamshied Sharifi
Films with screenplays by David N. Weiss
Films with screenplays by Rob Hedden
Nickelodeon Movies films
Paramount Pictures films
2000s English-language films
2000s American films